The Alfi was a German automobile built in Berlin by an electrical company between 1921 and 1924.  

The same company had been responsible for the AAA (AG für Akkumulatoren- und Automobilbau) electric cars and vans which were supplied in large numbers to the German Post Office. In 1922 when they decided to move to engine driven cars they changed their name to Alfi, derived from the owners name Alex Fisher.

The first Alfi model had a  flat-twin engine. This was followed by a side valve  inline-four engine manufactured by Steudel of Kamenz in Saxony.  Next came an inline four of  built by Atos of Berlin.

A new Alfi company, Alfi Automobile GmbH was formed in 1927, also by Alex Fisher.  This time the cars and vans were three-wheelers powered by DKW engines driving the single front wheel. These could be turned 180 degrees to propel the car backward. An additional four-wheeled model, the 4-wheeled Alfi Sport, had a 2/10PS engine, was bodied as an open or coupe two-seater, and was produced in small numbers. 

The company closed in 1928.

See also
Alfi Automobile GmbH
V4 engine
Drezdenko
Flat engine
Autohandel (in German)
Patent and history

Defunct motor vehicle manufacturers of Germany
Vintage vehicles
Vehicle manufacturing companies established in 1922
Vehicle manufacturing companies disestablished in 1928
1928 disestablishments in Germany
German companies established in 1922